Shree singha devi higher secondary school (Nenglish: Shreei sihngha daevie higher secondary school) is one of the oldest school in Damak Municipality in the Jhapa District in the Mechi Zone of south-eastern Terai of Nepal. This school was founded by स्व. हरि प्रसाद न्याैपाने. It is located at Damak-19. The school has a small botanical garden with different types of beautiful flowers.

Schools in Nepal